My First Album (also known as Jungle Jezebel and Divine) is the first album by American performance artist Divine. It was released in 1982.

Track listing

Charts

References

1982 debut albums
Divine (performer) albums